Alan Bicksler Fowler (born October 15, 1928) is an American physicist.

Life and education
He was born in Denver, Colorado on October 15, 1928.

Fowler served in the U.S. Army from 1946 to 1948 and from 1952 to 1953.

He earned a BS in 1951, then an MS in 1952 from Rensselaer Polytechnic Institute in Troy, New York. In 1958, he earned his PhD from Harvard University.

Fowler was married to Kathleen Devlin for 65 years, until her death in 2016, with whom he had two sons and two daughters.

He is a member of the National Academy of Sciences.

Career
He worked as a researcher for Raytheon Technologies, from 1953 to 1956, and for IBM Thomas J. Watson Research Center from 1958 to 1993, and was a member of the IBM MOS research group.

He is an IBM Fellow Emeritus.

Fowler is named as a co-inventor in nine U.S. Patents.

Fowler was awarded the Oliver E. Buckley Condensed Matter Prize by the American Physical Society in 1988.

References

1928 births
21st-century American physicists
IBM Fellows
Foreign Members of the Royal Society
Living people
Scientists from Denver
Members of the United States National Academy of Sciences
Oliver E. Buckley Condensed Matter Prize winners
Harvard University alumni
Fellows of the American Physical Society